Munroeodes is a genus of moths of the family Crambidae.

Species
Munroeodes australis Munroe, 1964
Munroeodes delavalis (Möschler, 1881)
Munroeodes thalesalis (Walker, 1859)
Munroeodes transparentalis Amsel, 1956

References

Natural History Museum Lepidoptera genus database

Pyraustinae
Crambidae genera
Taxa named by Hans Georg Amsel